Suicide was an American musical duo composed of vocalist Alan Vega and instrumentalist Martin Rev, intermittently active between 1970 and 2016. The group's pioneering music utilized minimalist electronic instrumentation, including synthesizers and primitive drum machines, and their early performances were confrontational and often ended in violence. They were among the first acts to use the phrase "punk music" in an advertisement for a concert in 1970—during their very brief stint as a three-piece including Paul Liebegott.

Though never widely popular among the general public, Suicide have been recognized as among the most influential acts of their era. Their debut album Suicide (1977) was described by Entertainment Weekly as "a landmark of electronic music", while AllMusic stated that it "provided the blueprints for post-punk, synth pop, and industrial rock."

History

Rev and Vega met and became friends in 1970. After the former's avant-jazz band broke up, they decided to form a band together. The initial line-up was - Vega (aka "Nasty Cut" or "Nasty Punk"): guitar, trumpet, vocals; Rev (aka "Marty Maniac"): drums, keyboard and Paul Liebegott (aka Cool P) guitar. Their first show was June 19, 1970 at the Project of Living Artists in lower Manhattan. They soon began billing themselves as "punk music". Liebegott left at the end of 1971, and they continued as a duo. By that point, Vega was no longer playing any instruments, and began performing only vocals. Rev stopped playing drums and blowing whistle by early 1975. By 1973, they had become part of lower Manhattan's underground music scene, and played shows with the likes of the New York Dolls and the Fast. Their first release was Rocket U.S.A., which was included on the 1976 Max's Kansas City compilation. The following year, they recorded and released their debut album.  They played their first overseas shows in 1978 playing support for Elvis Costello and the Clash in the UK and Western Europe.  They continued on and off, until playing their final shows in 2015. Shows scheduled for the following year were cancelled, due to Vega's declining health, and eventual death.

According to a 2002 interview of Alan Vega, the name of the band was inspired by the title of a Ghost Rider comic book issue titled "Satan Suicide". He further explained, "We were talking about society’s suicide, especially American society. New York City was collapsing. The Vietnam War was going on. The name Suicide said it all to us."

Rev's simple keyboard riffs, which were initially played on a battered Farfisa organ combined with effects units, before changing to a synthesizer, were accompanied by primitive drum machines. This provided a pulsing, minimalistic, electronic backdrop for Vega's murmuring and nervy vocals. It was the first band to use the term punk to describe itself, which the band had adopted from an article by Lester Bangs. Some of the band's earliest posters use the terms "punk music" and "punk music mass".

Early notoriety

Suicide emerged alongside the early glam punk scene in New York, with a reputation for its confrontational live shows. Many of the band's early shows were at the Mercer Arts Center, alongside bands such as the New York Dolls and Eric Emerson and the Magic Tramps. During an early show at the Mercer Arts Center David Johansen played harmonica with Suicide. Vega and Rev both dressed like 'arty street thugs', and Vega was notorious for brandishing a motorcycle drive chain onstage. Vega once stated, "We started getting booed as soon as we came onstage. Just from the way we looked, they started giving us hell already." This sort of audience confrontation was inspired by Vega's witnessing of an Iggy and the Stooges concert at the New York State Pavilion in August 1969, which he later described as "great art". After the collapse of the Mercer Arts Center in 1973, Suicide played at Max's Kansas City and CBGB (before being banned), often sharing the bill with emerging punk bands. Their first album was reissued with bonus material, including "23 Minutes Over Brussels", a recording of a Suicide concert that later deteriorated into a riot.

The band's first album, Suicide (1977), was released independently on Red Star Records. Although initial press reviews were divided (with Rolling Stone in particular giving it a scathing review), media recognition has changed over the years. One critic writes: Che', 'Ghost Rider'—these eerie, sturdy, proto-punk anthems rank among the most visionary, melodic experiments the rock realm has yet produced." Of note is the ten-minute "Frankie Teardrop", which tells the story of a poverty-stricken 20-year-old factory worker pushed to the edge. Critic Emerson Dameron writes that the song is "one of the most terrifying, riveting, absurd things I’ve ever heard." Nick Hornby, in his book 31 Songs, describes the track as something you would listen to "only once".

Other projects
In 1986, Alan Vega collaborated with Andrew Eldritch of The Sisters of Mercy on the Gift album, released under the name of The Sisterhood. In 1996, Vega collaborated with Alex Chilton and Ben Vaughn on the album Cubist Blues. Vega and Rev have both released solo albums.

Return
In 2002, Suicide released their first album in over a decade, titled American Supreme. Sales, however, were slow, and critical reception was mixed.

In 2005, SAF Publishing put out Suicide No Compromise, a "docu-biography" by David Nobahkt, which featured extensive interviews with Vega and Rev as well as many of their contemporaries and famous fans.

In 2008, Blast First Petite released Alan Vega 70th Birthday Limited Edition EP Series—a monthly, limited-edition series of 10" vinyl EPs and downloads by major artists, honoring Alan Vega's 70th birthday. Among those paying tribute were Bruce Springsteen, Primal Scream, Peaches, Grinderman, Spiritualized, The Horrors, +Pansonic, Julian Cope, Lydia Lunch, Vincent Gallo, LIARS, and The Klaxons. The label also released Suicide: 1977–1978, a 6-CD box set, the same year.

In September 2009, the group performed their debut LP live in its entirety as part of the All Tomorrow's Parties-curated Don't Look Back series.

In May 2010, the band performed the entire first album live at two London concerts, double billed with Iggy & The Stooges performing Raw Power. The band performed their final concert at London's Barbican Centre on 9 July 2015. Billed as 'A Punk Mass', the show featured solo sets by both Rev and Vega before a headlining Suicide performance. Henry Rollins, Bobby Gillespie, and Jehnny Beth made guest appearances. The concert received positive reviews.

Alan Vega died in his sleep on July 16, 2016, at the age of 78. His death was announced by musician and radio host Henry Rollins, who shared an official statement from Vega's family on his website.

Legacy 

Musicians who have listed Suicide as an influence include, among others, Television, Chrome, Wire, Public Image Ltd, Gary Numan, Richard Hell, Pere Ubu, Patti Smith, Talking Heads, Cabaret Voltaire, Steve Albini (from Shellac, Rapeman, and Big Black), The Jesus and Mary Chain, Bauhaus, The Sisters of Mercy, Soft Cell, Sigue Sigue Sputnik, The Birthday Party, Joy Division, Nick Cave, D.A.F., Erasure, the music of Giant Haystacks, The KLF, Ministry, Nine Inch Nails, OMD, Rocket from the Tombs, Cassandra Complex (and covered "Frankie Teardrop"), Mudhoney, Nitzer Ebb, Depeche Mode, R.E.M. (covered "Ghost Rider"), Devo, Ultravox, Massive Attack, Autechre, The Chemical Brothers, Daft Punk, Aphex Twin, The Kills,  AFI, and Bruce Springsteen.

Covers
In 1994, The Crow: Original Motion Picture Soundtrack contains "Ghost Rider", covered by the Rollins Band. That same year The Fatima Mansions released a cover of "Diamonds, Fur Coat, Champagne", as part of their 1994 single "Nite Flights". In May 1999, ? and the Mysterians released a cover of "Cheree" on the album More Action.

The riff from "Ghost Rider" was sampled extensively in M.I.A.'s single, "Born Free", released in April 2010. Martin Rev joined M.I.A. to perform the song on the Late Show with David Letterman.

In mid-2009, the band The Horrors released a cover of the song "Shadazz", as part of a tribute to Alan Vega and his work. They have performed it many times live, along with another Suicide song, "Ghost Rider". Later that year, Primal Scream and Miss Kittin covered the song "Diamonds, Fur Coat, Champagne" for a limited-edition 10-inch vinyl pressing. A total of 3,000 copies were pressed and released on March 30, 2009.

"Ghost Rider" was covered by the garage punk band The Gories, and released on the album Cheapo Crypt Sampler No. 2. In April 2011, the influential dance-punk band LCD Soundsystem used a snippet from "Ghost Rider" during the song "Losing My Edge", and covered the Alan Vega solo effort "Bye Bye Bayou" during their final concert, held in a sold-out Madison Square Garden. The song was also covered by British duo The Last Shadow Puppets at New York City's Terminal 5, as a tribute to Alan Vega, shortly after his death in 2016. 

In April 2012, Neneh Cherry released a cover of the song "Dream Baby Dream", which appeared on her album The Cherry Thing. In May 2014, The band Savages, also released a live cover of the song as a b-side of their single "Fuckers"/"Dream Baby Dream" 12". Other artists who covered the song include, long time fan, Bruce Springsteen in 2016, and Many Angled Ones & Guy McKnight, in August 2018.

Discography
Both Alan Vega and Martin Rev have recorded solo albums; see Alan Vega discography and Martin Rev discography.

Studio albums
 1977 – Suicide
 1980 – Suicide: Alan Vega and Martin Rev
 1988 – A Way of Life
The 2005 Blast First/Mute/EMI CD reissue has a slightly different mix of the album, most notably the song "Surrender", and includes a live bonus disc recorded in 1987. Videos for Dominic Christ and Surrender by Stefan Roloff.
 1992 – Why Be Blue
The 2005 Blast First/Mute/EMI CD reissue includes a live bonus disc recorded in 1989 and a complete remix by Martin Rev of the original album and different track order.
 2002 – American Supreme
Initial CD copies included a live bonus disc recorded in 1998.

Live albums
 1978 – 21½ Minutes in Berlin/23 Minutes in Brussels
 1981 – Half Alive (A collection of live and demo material recorded from 1975–1979. Originally released by ROIR on cassette only. With liner notes by Lester Bangs.)
 1986 – Ghost Riders (A live concert from 1981 – originally released on cassette only.)
 1997 – Zero Hour (Late '70s live recordings.)
 2004 – Attempted: Live at Max's Kansas City 1980 (Soundboard recordings from a New York City rock club performance. With liner notes by Marty Thau.)
 2008 – Live 1977–1978 (A six-CD box set containing 13 complete Suicide live performances from September 1977 to August 1978 plus bonus material.)

EPs
 1978 – 23 Minutes Over Brussels
 1998 – 22/1/98 – Reinventing America (Recorded live at The Barbican – "Inventing America" launch party.)

Singles
 1978 – "Cheree" / "I Remember"
 1979 – "Dream Baby Dream" / "Radiation"

References

Further reading

External links
Suicide Story on ZE Records official website
Suicide and You, by Matthew Moyer 
"Suicide Watch" article by Simon Reynolds on Alan Vega, including some information on Suicide in general
Complete concert chronology
Very complete discography
Martin Rev official site
Alan Vega official site
Dominic Christ: 
Video for Way of Life by Stefan Roloff

 
Punk rock groups from New York (state)
Blast First artists
Bronze Records artists
Electronic music duos
Rock music duos
Protopunk groups
Electropunk musical groups
ROIR artists
Musical groups established in 1970
Musical groups disestablished in 2016
Musical groups from New York City
ZE Records artists
American musical duos
Wax Trax! Records artists